November 12 - Eastern Orthodox liturgical calendar - November 14

All fixed commemorations below celebrated on November 26 by Orthodox Churches on the Old Calendar.

For November 13th, Orthodox Churches on the Old Calendar commemorate the Saints listed on October 31.

Saints

 Martyrs Antoninus, Nicephorus, Germanus, and Manetha, of Caesarea in Palestine (308)  (see also: November 12)
 Saint John Chrysostom (the "Golden-Mouthed"), Archbishop of Constantinople (407)

Pre-Schism Western saints

 Saints Valentine, Solutor and Victor, martyrs venerated in Ravenna in Italy (305)  (see also: November 11)
 Saint Matrius (Mitrius, Mitre, Metre, Merre), a Greek slave that was abused and beheaded (314)
 Saint Damasus, Pope of Rome (384)
 Saints Arcadius, Paschasius, Probus, Eutychian and Paulillus, Protomartyrs of the Vandal persecution (437)
 Saint Bricius (Brice, Britius, Brixius), Bishop of Tours (444)
 Saint Euphrasius (Eufrèse), Bishop of Clermont, Gaul (515)
 Saint Leonien of Vienne (Leoninus), Gaul (518)
 Saint Quintianus, Bishop of Clermont, Gaul (525)
 Saint Dalmatius of Rodez, Bishop of Rodez (580)
 Saint Devinicus (Denick, Teavneck), worked with Sts Columba and Machar and preached in Caithness, probably as a bishop (6th century)
 Saint Columba the Virgin, a virgin-martyr in Cornwall, where she is the patron-saint of two parishes.
 Saint Eugenius I of Toledo, Bishop of Toledo (657)
 Saint Maxellendis, stabbed to death in Caudry near Cambrai in the north of France because she wished to be a nun (c. 670)
 Saint Chillien (Kilian), missionary in Artois in the north of France (7th century)
 Saint Gredifael, a saint who accompanied St Paternus from Brittany to Wales, was Abbot of Whitland Abbey in Dyfed (7th century)
 Saint Abbo of Fleury, Abbot of Fleury, martyred in La Réole in Gascony (c. 1004)

Post-Schism Orthodox saints

 New Monk-martyr Damascene of the Great Lavra (Athos) and Constantinople (1681)

Other commemorations

 Repose of Archbishop Ioasaph (Skorodumov) of Canada (1955)
 Repose of Monk Juvian the Chronicler, of Valaam Monastery (1957)
 Repose of Schema-Nun Irene Myrtidiotissa of Chios (1960)
 Repose of Archimandrite Constantine (Zaitsev) of Jordanville, New York (1975)

Icon gallery

Notes

References

Sources
 November 13/November 26. Orthodox Calendar (PRAVOSLAVIE.RU).
 November 26 / November 13. HOLY TRINITY RUSSIAN ORTHODOX CHURCH (A parish of the Patriarchate of Moscow).
 November 13. OCA - The Lives of the Saints.
 The Autonomous Orthodox Metropolia of Western Europe and the Americas (ROCOR). St. Hilarion Calendar of Saints for the year of our Lord 2004. St. Hilarion Press (Austin, TX). p. 85.
 The Thirteenth Day of the Month of November. Orthodoxy in China.
 November 13. Latin Saints of the Orthodox Patriarchate of Rome.
 The Roman Martyrology. Transl. by the Archbishop of Baltimore. Last Edition, According to the Copy Printed at Rome in 1914. Revised Edition, with the Imprimatur of His Eminence Cardinal Gibbons. Baltimore: John Murphy Company, 1916. pp. 350–351.
 Rev. Richard Stanton. A Menology of England and Wales, or, Brief Memorials of the Ancient British and English Saints Arranged According to the Calendar, Together with the Martyrs of the 16th and 17th Centuries. London: Burns & Oates, 1892. pp. 537–538.
Greek Sources
 Great Synaxaristes:  13 ΝΟΕΜΒΡΙΟΥ. ΜΕΓΑΣ ΣΥΝΑΞΑΡΙΣΤΗΣ.
  Συναξαριστής. 13 Νοεμβρίου. ECCLESIA.GR. (H ΕΚΚΛΗΣΙΑ ΤΗΣ ΕΛΛΑΔΟΣ).
  13/11/2016. Ορθόδοξος Συναξαριστής. 
Russian Sources
  26 ноября (13 ноября). Православная Энциклопедия под редакцией Патриарха Московского и всея Руси Кирилла (электронная версия). (Orthodox Encyclopedia - Pravenc.ru).
  13 ноября по старому стилю  /  26 ноября по новому стилю. Русская Православная Церковь - Православный церковный календарь на 2016 год.

November in the Eastern Orthodox calendar